Roslagen is the name of the coastal areas of Uppland province in Sweden, which also constitutes the northern part of the Stockholm archipelago.

Historically, it was the name for all the coastal areas of the Baltic Sea, including the eastern parts of lake Mälaren, belonging to Svealand. The name was first mentioned in the year 1493 as "Rodzlagen". Before that the area was known as Roden. Roden had a skeppslag (roughly translated: ship district), the coastal equivalent to the inland Hundreds.
When the king would issue a call to leidang, the Viking Age equivalent of military conscript service, the skeppslag in Roden was responsible for raising ships for the leidang navy.

The name comes from the rodslag, which is an old coastal Uppland word for a rowing crew of warrior oarsmen.

A person from Roslagen is called a Rospigg which means "inhabitant of Ros". Swedes from the Roslagen area, that is "the people of Ros", gave their name to the Rus' people and thus to the states of Russia and Belarus (see Rus' (name)).

The area also gives its name to the endangered domesticated Roslag sheep, which originated from the area centuries ago.

Communications
The region is served by the Roslagsbanan, a narrow-gauge railway network from Stockholm, going as far noth as Kårsta. The motorway E18 goes through Roslagen between Kapellskär and Stockholm.

Nature
The hiking trail Roslagsleden crosses the region starting in Danderyd and ending in Grisslehamn.

See also
Attundaland
Fjärdhundraland
Fälö by
Tiundaland
Stones of Mora
Swedes (Germanic tribe)
Norrtälje

References

External links
  http://www.roslagen.se/ Tourism page

Coasts of the Baltic Sea
Uppland
History of the Rus' people